This timeline of the history of piracy in the 1620s is a chronological list of key events involving pirates between 1620 and 1629.

Events

1620 

 Unknown - Jans Janszoon, also known as Murat Reis the Younger, a Dutch Barbary Pirate, converts to Islam.

1621 

 January 6 - Roger North is imprisoned in the Tower of London.
 July 18 - Roger North is released from the Tower of London.
 Late October - The 120-ton Jacob of Bristol was attacked and captured in the Strait of Gibraltar by Algerian corsairs.
 Mid-November - The Nicholas and the George Bonaventure, two small English merchantmen, were attacked and captured near the Strait of Gibraltar.

1622 

 December 26 - The Jacob is, again, attacked near the Strait of Gibraltar and sunk.

1625 

 Zheng Zhilong founds Shibazhi, an organization of Chinese pirates.

1626 

 Unknown - Cornelius Jol joins the Dutch West India Company and becomes an admiral.

1627

 During the 14 days between the 4th and the 19th of July - Murat Reis the Younger raided both Eastern Region and Vestmannaeyjar in Iceland. The raid on Vestmannaeyjar is called The Turkish abductions.
 Unknown - Murat Reis the Younger captures the island of Lundy in the Bristol Channel and holds it for five years.

1628 

 Unknown - Piet Pieterszoon Hein, with the help of Moses Cohen Henriques, capture the Spanish treasure fleet during a battle in the Bay of Mantanzas in Cuba during the Eighty Years' War.
 Unknown - Zheng Zhilong defeats the Ming Dynasty's fleet then begins working for them and is appointed major general.

Births

1620 

 Unknown - John Murphy Fitzgerald, also known as Juan Morfa

1628 

 Unknown - John Aylett

1629 

 Unknown - Daniel Johnson

Deaths

1620 

 October 10 - Sulayman Reis

1622 

 April 17 - Richard Hawkins
 Summer - Jack Ward
 Unknown - Jan Jacobsen

1627 

 February 22 - Olivier van Noort
 Unknown - Hendrick Jacobszoon Lucifer

1628 

 August 18 - Piers Griffith

1629 

 June 18 - Piet Pieterszoon Hein

References 

Piracy by year
Piracy